Cover Up is an album by UB40, released in 2001. It was their first studio album release since 1998 when they released Labour of Love III. It debuted at number 29 on the UK charts but dropped out of the top-100 after its third week. There was no US release, but rather it was released as an international release. The first single released from this album was "Since I Met You Lady", but it did not rise higher than No. 40 on the UK charts.

Track listing
All tracks composed by UB40; except where indicated

References

2001 albums
UB40 albums